Ștefan Dimitrescu (January 18, 1886 – May 22, 1933) was a Romanian Post-impressionist painter and draftsman.

Biography
Born in Huși into a modest family, he completed his primary and secondary studies in his hometown. In 1903, deciding to follow his passion for music, he left for Iași, where he took cello classes at the Iași Conservatory.

In summer of 1903, Dimitrescu entered the National School of Fine Arts in the city, studying in the same class as Nicolae Tonitza; the two studied under Gheorghe Popovici and Emanoil Bardasare. After graduation, Dimitrescu painted murals for the Orthodox churches in Agăș and Asău (Bacău County).
Between 1912 and 1913, he studied in Paris, at the Académie de la Grande Chaumière, during which time he was attracted to Impressionism.

Drafted into the Romanian Army at the start of the Romanian Campaign of World War I, Dimitrescu was profoundly touched by the experience, and began painting tragic pieces that documented the misery brought by the conflict. Like his friend Tonitza, he began exploring social themes, such as queuing and the effects of bombardments.

In 1917, along with the painters Camil Ressu, Iosif Iser, Marius Bunescu and the sculptors Dimitrie Paciurea, Cornel Medrea, Ion Jalea and Oscar Han, he founded the Art of Romania association in their Iași refuge. In 1926, Dimitrescu, with Oscar Han, Francisc Șirato, and Nicolae Tonitza, established Grupul celor patru ("The Group of Four").

He became a teacher at the Iași National School of Fine Arts in 1927, and, during the next year, he was named its headmaster (a position he held until his death). Towards the end of his life, Dimitrescu began expanding his palette to cover more somber colors, while exploring compositions in which the background was stripped of details and usually of a dominant white.

He died in Iași and he was buried at the Eternitatea Cemetery.

Art
Most of Dimitrescu's paintings take inspiration mainly from the life of simple folk, and especially from that of Romanian peasants and miners; they attempt to portray Romanian traditions and way of life, drawing on his encounters with both Byzantine art and the work of Paul Cézanne.

Part of his art (between 1926 and 1933) was inspired by his travels to Dobruja, and have been considered to be the most accomplished synthesis between his craft as a draftsman and his art as a painter.

Many of his works are exhibited in Bârlad (at the Vasile Pârvan Museum), Bucharest (the National Museum of Art of Romania and the Zambaccian Museum), Cluj-Napoca (Cluj Art Museum) and in private collections outside Romania (in Austria, Belgium, France and Germany).

Gallery
Click on an image to view it enlarged.

Notes

References
Ionel Jianu, Stefan Dimitrescu, Editura de Stat pentru Literatura si Arta, Bucharest, 1954
Beatrice Bednarik, Stefan Dimitrescu, Editura Meridiane, Bucharest, 1965
Raul Șorban, Nicolae Tonitza, Editura Meridiane, Bucharest, 1965
Oscar Han, Dalti si pensule, Editura Minerva, Bucharest, 1970  
Vasile Drăguț, Vasile Florea, Dan Grigorescu, Marin Mihalache, Pictura românească în imagini, Editura Meridiane, Bucharest, 1970
Claudiu Paradais, Stefan Dimitrescu, Editura Meridiane, Bucharest, 1978
Doina Pauleanu, Grupul celor patru, Editura MO, Bucharest, 2012
Dana Oltean, Pictorul Stefan Dimitrescu si "vioara lui Ingres" în lumina documentelor de arhiva ale Conservatorului din Iasi, Ioan Neculce. Buletinul Muzeului de Istorie a Moldovei, XXIII, 2017

External links

 Gallery A Entry
 Ștefan Dimitrescu - a life dedicated to painting
 Ștefan Dimitrescu - 70 years since his death

1886 births
1933 deaths
People from Huși
Post-impressionist painters
Academic staff of the George Enescu National University of Arts
Romanian painters
Romanian people of World War I
Alumni of the Académie de la Grande Chaumière